Ohzano Dam is an earthfill dam located in Fukuoka Prefecture in Japan. The dam is used for water supply. The catchment area of the dam is 1.3 km2. The dam impounds about 3  ha of land when full and can store 195 thousand cubic meters of water. The construction of the dam was started on 1970 and completed in 1974.

References

Dams in Fukuoka Prefecture
1974 establishments in Japan